"Thiruvasakam" in Tamil means The Holy Text. Thiruvasakam is the report which was sent to humanity about the arrival of God to the world according to Ayyavazhi mythology. They are four in number, as written in the Akilathirattu Ammanai.

Thiruvasakam - 1
The Thiruvasakam - 1 reads as follows:

"The three great Godheads have taken cognisance of the state of disorder in the world. To rectify the same, we are writing this as a first step so that the Kalineesan might amend. We will come into the world as Narayana Pantaram in the year 1008. When we come, we will undertake a tavam and destroy the kaliyuga. Black magic, trickery, witchcraft, sorcery, and the demons and devils will be thrown into fire.  Those who remain committed to these words of Thiruvasakam will attain Dharmapathi, i.e. the abode of righteousness".

With these words, the Thiruvasakam - 1 was sent out to the world.

Thiruvasakam - 2
Thiruvasakam - 3
Thiruvasakam - 4

See also
Hindu gods
Ayyavazhi mythology
List of Ayyavazhi-related articles

Ayyavazhi mythology